Länghem is a locality situated in Tranemo Municipality, Västra Götaland County, Sweden with 989 inhabitants in 2010.

References 

Populated places in Västra Götaland County
Populated places in Tranemo Municipality